Günther's racer (Ditypophis vivax) is a snake in the family Pseudoxyrhophiidae. 

It is found in Socotra.

References 

Pseudoxyrhophiidae
Endemic fauna of Socotra
Reptiles described in 1881
Taxa named by Albert Günther